A great ellipse is an ellipse passing through two points on a spheroid and having the same center as that of the spheroid. Equivalently, it is an ellipse on the surface of a spheroid and centered on the origin, or the curve formed by intersecting the spheroid by a plane through its center.
The great ellipse therefore is sometimes proposed as a suitable route for marine navigation.
The great ellipse is special case of an earth section path.

Introduction 

Assume that the spheroid, an ellipsoid of revolution, has an equatorial radius  and polar semi-axis . Define the flattening , the eccentricity , and the second eccentricity .

There are various ways to map an ellipsoid into a sphere of radius  in such a way as to map the great ellipse into a great circle, allowing the methods of great-circle navigation to be used:
 The ellipsoid can be stretched in a direction parallel to the axis of rotation; this maps a point of latitude  on the ellipsoid to a point on the sphere with latitude , the parametric latitude.
 A point on the ellipsoid can mapped radially onto the sphere along the line connecting it with the center of the ellipsoid; this maps a point of latitude  on the ellipsoid to a point on the sphere with latitude , the geocentric latitude.

These map into way-points on the corresponding great ellipse.

Mapping the great ellipse to a great circle 

If distances and headings are needed, it is simplest to use the first of the mappings. In detail, the mapping is as follows (this description is taken from ):

 The geographic latitude  on the ellipsoid maps to the parametric latitude  on the sphere, where
 The longitude  is unchanged.
 Positions on the great circle of radius  are parametrized by arc length  measured from the northward crossing of the equator.

(A similar mapping to an auxiliary sphere is carried out in the solution of geodesics on an ellipsoid. The differences are that the azimuth  is conserved in the mapping, while the longitude  maps to a "spherical" longitude .

Solving the inverse problem 

The distance  is found by computing the length of a portion of perimeter of the ellipse using the formula giving the meridian arc in terms the parametric latitude.

This also enables way-points (e.g., a series of equally spaced intermediate points) to be found in the solution of the inverse problem.

See also 
 Earth section paths
 Great-circle navigation
 Geodesics on an ellipsoid
 Meridian arc
 Rhumb line

References

External links 
 Matlab implementation of the solutions for the direct and inverse problems for great ellipses.

Geometry
Curves